Steve Clark is a cartoon animator and director. His first credit was The Dick Tracy Show.

External links
Steve Clark at the Internet Movie Database

American animators
American animated film directors
Possibly living people
Place of birth missing
Year of birth missing